The Princes Channel wreck, also known as the Gresham Ship is an Elizabethan shipwreck (c. 1574) that was discovered in the Princes Channel in the Thames Estuary. It was discovered by the Port of London Authority in 2004 during a dredging operation to remove obstructions that posed hazards and impeded navigation during low tides (Auer, J. and Firth, A.).

Archaeological remains

20% of the wreck was recovered and lifted from the Thames Estuary, excavated and recovered by Wessex Archaeology. It was then taken to Horsea Island, an estuarine lake near Portsmouth so it could be preserved. A five-year research project ("The Gresham Ship Project"), was carried out from 2007 to 2012 by researchers from University College London and the University of Southern Denmark. The project focused on five large sections of the hull that had been recovered, as well as associated artefacts. The hull timbers are now a major exhibit at the UK National Dive Centre at Stoney Cove.

The design and construction of the Princes Channel Wreck is of Archaeological significance, as it appears to have been rebuilt using the method of furring, which allowed the vessel to gain about 1 foot in width on each side. The rebuilding may have been necessary if the ship was crank-sided.

Naming
There has been debate as to the preliminary naming of the wreck, as it was found in the Princes Channel at the mouth of the Thames estuary. However the more popular name of Gresham Ship was introduced when the guns on board the vessel revealed a grasshopper insignia, which was the motif made by Sir Thomas Gresham, founder of the Royal Exchange.

References

Auer, J. and Firth, A. (2007). The Gresham Ship: an interim report on a 16th –century wreck from Princes Channel, Thames Estuary. Post-Medieval Archaeology. Vol 41, 222- 41.
Perrin, W. G. (1929-1930). Botelerʼs Dialogues. London: Navy Record Society Vol. LXV. Perrin, W.G. (Ed.) (1918). The Autobiography of Phineas Pett. London: Navy Records Society. 
Manwaring G. E. & Perrin W. G. (Ed.) (1922). The Life and works of Sir Henry Mainwaring. Volume II: The Seamanʼs Dictionary. London: Navy Records Society, Vol. LVI.
Wagstaffe, Cate. 2010. Furring in the light of 16th century ship design. MA thesis, SDU: Esbjerg.

External links

Online Exhibition

High-Resolution interactive 3D model of ship remains created by the Nautical Archaeology Society and the Maritime Archaeology Trust

Shipwrecks of the River Thames
16th-century ships
Archaeology of shipwrecks
Underwater archaeological sites